Tinagma pulverilinea is a moth in the Douglasiidae family. It is found in North America, where it has been recorded from Alberta, Montana and California.

The wingspan is 9–11 mm. The forewings are grey with a broad white bar. There is a broad dark transverse fascia just before the middle of the wing, bordered outwardly by a row of white scales. The hindwings are grey.

References

Moths described in 1921
Douglasiidae